Fitzgerald (Fort Smith) Water Aerodrome  was located adjacent to Fort Smith, Northwest Territories, Canada, across the Alberta border. The airport was listed as abandoned in the 15 March 2007 Canada Flight Supplement.

References

Defunct seaplane bases in Alberta